Antoine Marcus Agudio (born January 20, 1985) is an American professional basketball player who last played for the Canton Charge of the NBA Development League. He played college basketball for Hofstra University.

High school career
Agudio attended Walt Whitman High School in Huntington Station, New York. As a junior in 2001–02, he averaged 22 points per game, and as a senior in 2002–03, he averaged 24.9 points per game, earning All-Long Island honors both years and a pair of Long Island Championships. He also earned first team All-New York State as a senior.

College career
After redshirting the 2003–04 season due to a broken hand, Agudio started all 30 games in 2004–05, becoming the first Hofstra freshman to start every game since Speedy Claxton in 1996–97. He went on to be named the 2005 Colonial Athletic Association (CAA) Rookie of the Year. He was also named to the CAA All-Rookie team, All-CAA third team and CAA All-Tournament team. He averaged 15.1 points, 3.2 rebounds, and 2.4 assists per game.

In his sophomore season, he became the first sophomore in school history to reach the 1,000-point plateau in an NIT second round win over Saint Joseph's. He was named to the All-CAA second team and NABC All-District second team. In 33 games (all starts), he averaged 17.2 points, 2.9 rebounds and 2.7 assists per game.

In his junior season, he was named to the All-CAA first team and NABC All-District first team. He was also named the Most Valuable Player of the Aeropostale Holiday Festival. In 32 games (all starts), he averaged 20.2 points, 4.0 rebounds and 2.6 assists per game.

In his senior season, he was named to the All-CAA first team and NABC All-District first team for the second straight year. In 27 games, he averaged 22.7 points, 3.9 rebounds and 2.9 assists per game.

Professional career

Banvit B.K.
Agudio went undrafted in the 2008 NBA draft. He later signed with Banvit B.K. of Turkey for the 2008–09 season. In December 2008, he left Banvit after 16 games.

Albuquerque Thunderbirds
On January 29, 2009, he was acquired by the Albuquerque Thunderbirds of the NBA Development League.

In November 2009, Agudio was reacquired by the Albuquerque Thunderbirds. In 2009–10, he played 50 games (43 starts), averaging 15.1 points on .463 shooting (.463 from three-point range), 2.5 rebounds, 2.8 assists and 1.0 steal in 32.1 minutes per game.

VOO Verviers-Pepinster
In July 2010, Agudio joined the Milwaukee Bucks for the 2010 NBA Summer League. In August 2010, he signed with VOO Verviers-Pepinster of Belgium for the 2010–11 season. On February 10, 2011, he parted ways with VOO Verviers-Pepinster after 15 games.

Canton Charge
On December 1, 2011, Agudio signed with the Canton Charge for the 2011–12 season.

In November 2012, Agudio was reacquired by the Charge.

In November 2013, Agudio was reacquired by the Charge.

On November 2, 2014, Agudio was again reacquired by the Charge.

On October 30, 2015, Agudio returned to Canton.

Personal
Agudio's father, Alex, also attended Walt Whitman High School and later played college basketball for Penn State.

References

External links
 Hofstra bio
 NBA D-League Profile

1985 births
Living people
Albuquerque Thunderbirds players
American expatriate basketball people in Belgium
American expatriate basketball people in Turkey
Bandırma B.İ.K. players
Basketball players from New York (state)
Canton Charge players
Hofstra Pride men's basketball players
People from Huntington Station, New York
Point guards
Shooting guards
American men's basketball players